Thalli Pogathey is a 2017-2017 Singaporean-Tamil-language family soap opera starring Jaynesh, Indra, Vignesh, Vimala and Puravalan. It replaced mystery thriller Drama Yaar? and it broadcast on MediaCorp Vasantham on Monday through Thursday from 3 July 2017 to 21 September 2017 at 10:30PM (SST) for 45 Episodes.

It revolves around a married couple, Samar and Ramya. Samar goes to a business trip in the overseas where he is kidnapped and nowhere to be found. Days later, he is presumed to be dead. 7 years later, he returns to his homeland and shocks everyone including Ramya. The rest of the story forms the drama.

Cast
Main Cast
 Jaynesh as Samar
 Indra as Ramya

Additional cast
 Vickneswary Se as Parineetha a.k.a. Pari
 Vimala 
 Puravalan
 Shanthi
 Shamini
 Lingam
 Satyamorthi as Suraj
 Nisha Kumar 
 Kasthuri
 Saravanan
 Jayaram
 Poovani

Original soundtrack

Soundtrack

Broadcast
Series was released on 3 July 2017 on Mediacorp Vasantham. It aired in Singapore on Mediacorp Vasantham, Its full length episodes and released its episodes on their app Toggle, a live TV feature was introduced on Toggle with English Subtitle.

References

External links 
 Vasantham Official Website
 Vasantham Facebook
 Thalli Pogathey Serial Episodes

Vasantham TV original programming
Tamil-language television shows in Singapore
Tamil-language romance television series
2017 Tamil-language television series debuts
2017 Tamil-language television series endings
Singapore Tamil dramas